Decibel is a monthly heavy metal magazine published by the Philadelphia-based Red Flag Media since October 2004. Its sections include Upfront, Features, Reviews, Guest Columns and the Decibel Hall of Fame. The magazine's tag-line is currently "Extremely Extreme" (previously "The New Noise"); the editor-in-chief is Albert Mudrian.

Features

Hall of Fame
Each issue of Decibel features an article dubbed the Hall of Fame which pays tribute to a significant album in the history of heavy metal music. All contributing band members to the specific album must be alive at the time of interviewing.

In 2009, 25 of the Hall of Fame entries were used as the basis for the book Precious Metal: Decibel Presents the Stories Behind 25 Extreme Metal Masterpieces released through Da Capo Press. The book also includes previously unreleased interview questions that were left out of the magazine articles, and a full piece on Darkthrone's Transilvanian Hunger that was never published in a magazine due to its length.

Flexi Series
In November 2010, the magazine announced the launch of the monthly Decibel Flexi Series. Beginning with the January 2011 issue (#75), the magazine now includes a limited vinyl flexi disc bound into the magazine each month available exclusively to its subscribers.

Tour
Beginning in 2012, Decibel puts on an annual tour in the US and Canada. According to metal blog No Clean Singing, typically the tour is headlined by a seasoned death metal band and includes three supporting acts: a "hard-touring band with a dependable legion of fans"; a "critical darling band in search of a wider audience, one that Decibel Magazine has put a lot of page space into supporting"; and a "pit-friendly band with connections to the metal underground, one early in their career and sporting a charismatic frontman". Some dates of the tour also include local openers.

References

External links 
 
The Decibel Magazine Tour website

Music magazines published in the United States
Monthly magazines published in the United States
Heavy metal publications
Magazines established in 2004
Magazines published in Philadelphia
Periodicals with audio content
2004 establishments in Pennsylvania